BPM (Beats Per Minute) is an American magazine, launched in 1996 Hollywood, California, publishing original content on Music, Technology, Nightlife and Style. BPM relaunched in December 2011 after a brief hiatus as the BPM network, with a combination of original content and curated aggregation from key websites in and around Electronic Dance Music.

After another long hiatus, the magazine has recently reborn in 2021, in Europe under a new digital-native version, still covering Electronic Music through Culture, News, Music, Videos, Lifestyle and Interviews.

References

Dance music magazines
Magazines established in 1996
Magazines published in California
Online music magazines published in the United States